Lê Dụ Tông (chữ Hán: 黎裕宗, 1679 – 27 February 1731), born Lê Duy Đường (黎維禟) was an emperor of Vietnam, the 22nd emperor of Vietnamese Later Lê dynasty. He reigned as emperor from 1705–1729 (24 years), the first ten years of which his father Lê Hy Tông was alive and elevated in semi-retirement to Retired Emperor. He was succeeded by Lê Duy Phường, also known as the second emperor to carry the name Hôn Đức Công.

Issue
He had five sons. They are Lê Duy Phường, Lê Duy Mật, Lê Duy Quý, Lê Thuần Tông and Lê Ý Tông.

References

1679 births
1731 deaths
D
Vietnamese retired emperors
Vietnamese monarchs